Converse is an American lifestyle brand that markets, distributes, and licenses footwear, apparel, and accessories. Founded in 1908 as the Converse Rubber Shoe Company, it has been acquired by several companies before becoming a subsidiary of Nike, Inc. in 2003.

Converse initially produced winterized rubber-soled shoes and boots. During World War II, it shifted manufacturing to make footwear for the military. Initially, it was one of the few producers of athletic shoes and dominated the U.S. market, but lost its position in the 1970s as competitors presented their styles.

Converse's portfolio includes products under the Chuck Taylor All-Star, Cons, Jack Purcell, One Star, and Star Chevron trademarks. It frequently collaborates on special-edition product releases with other brands such as John Varvatos. As of 2019, Converse sold products through 109 company-owned retail stores in the United States and 63 stores in international markets. The growth of Converse as a casual fashion accessory contributed to $2.3 billion in revenue in 2022.

History

Early years
Forty-seven-year-old Marquis Mills Converse, a manager at a footwear manufacturing firm, opened the Converse Rubber Shoe Company in February 1908, in Malden, Massachusetts. The company was a rubber shoe manufacturer, providing winterized rubber-soled footwear for adults and children. By 1910, Converse was producing shoes daily, but it was not until 1915 that it began manufacturing athletic shoes.

In 1918, the Converse All-Star basketball shoe was introduced. Then in 1923, a basketball player named Charles H. "Chuck" Taylor walked into Converse complaining of sore feet. Converse gave him a job as a salesman and ambassador, promoting the shoes around the U.S., and in 1932 Taylor's signature was added to the All-Star patch on the high-topped sneakers. He continued this work until shortly before his death in 1969. Sales for the All-Star soared until 1929 when the company fell into bankruptcy.

1941–2001: War, rise, and bankruptcy 
When the U.S. entered World War II in 1941, Converse shifted production to manufacturing rubberized footwear, outerwear, and protective suits for the military. The company resumed production of athletic footwear after the war's end. Popular during the 1950s and 1960s, Converse promoted an American image with its Converse Basketball Yearbook. Artist Charles Kerins created cover art that celebrated Converse's role in the lives of high school and college athletes.

Converse customized shoes for the New York Renaissance (the "Rens"), the first all-African-American professional basketball team. In 1962, center Wilt Chamberlain of the Philadelphia Warriors scored 100 points in a National Basketball Association (NBA) game while wearing a pair of Chucks, taking a 169–147 victory over the New York Knicks in Hershey, Pennsylvania, on March 2.

By the early 1970s, Converse had diversified to include manufacturing sporting goods and industrial products. Converse was acquired by the Eltra Corporation in 1972, and bought out one of its biggest competitors at the time, PF Flyers, from B.F. Goodrich. However, federal courts ruled the sale a monopoly and the deal was subsequently broken up through anti-trust litigation. Converse only retained the trademark rights to the Jack Purcell line, which it still produces. The chevron and star insignia—a logo that remains on a large portion of Converse footwear other than the All Star—was created by Jim Labadini, an employee. Eltra was acquired by Allied Corporation in 1979.

Converse lost its athletic shoe monopoly from the 1970s' onward, as new competitors, including Puma, Adidas, and Nike, grew in popularity. A decade later, as Reebok introduced new designs and technology to the sports market, Converse was no longer the official shoe of the NBA. Although canvas-rubber shoes regained popularity in the 1980s as casual footwear, Converse eventually became too dependent on the "All Stars" basketball brand, whose market collapsed by 1989–1990. By 2000, Converse was slipping repeatedly into receivership as debt piled up yearly.

Converse filed for bankruptcy on January 22, 2001. On March 30, its last manufacturing plants in the U.S. closed down, as production fully moved overseas. In April 2001, Footwear Acquisitions, led by Marsden Cason and Bill Simon, purchased the brand from bankruptcy and added industry partners Jack Boys, Jim Stroesser, Lisa Kempa, and David Maddocks to lead the turnaround. During this period, Converse moved its headquarters from North Reading, Massachusetts, to North Andover, Massachusetts. The company was located in the town of North Andover for 13 years.

Acquisition by Nike and new headquarters
In July 2003, Nike paid  to acquire Converse. Around 2010, Nike relaunched the footwear, taking advantage of the wave of 1980s revival. The company also expanded the Converse brand to include apparel and accessories, akin to Nike's other brands.

In January 2013, Converse announced plans for a new headquarters building. It was constructed near North Station in downtown Boston, on the Lovejoy Wharf, as part of a site overhaul and restoration of public waterfront access. The 10-story  office building includes a permanent music recording studio,  gym with separate yoga studio, and a  retail store.

Litigation 
Starting in July 2008, Converse sent around 180 cease-and-desist letters to over 30 companies that they claimed were violating the Chuck Taylor All Star trademark and selling so-called look-alike sneakers.

In October 2014, Converse filed a lawsuit against 30 companies for allegedly infringing on its generic sneaker style's bumper toe, striped midsole, and toe cap. The brand argued that companies were violating an alleged common-law trademark by importing sneakers with similar elements. Several companies settled with Converse and they were dropped from the list.

In November 2015, Charles Bullock, chief administrative judge at the International Trade Commission, preliminarily ruled that several brands Converse filed against were violating Converse's outsole design trademarks, i.e. the pattern on the bottom of the sole of the shoe. Judge Bullock further ruled that while Skechers "Twinkle Toes" brands did share similarities to Converse, "Twinkle Toes" were different enough and marketed in a way for it not to be mistaken for Chuck Taylor All-Stars. Judge Bullock also ruled that most of the shoes sold by Highline United under the Ash brand did not infringe and that Converse did not have a valid common law mark for its midsole.

On June 23, 2016, the anniversary of the death of Chuck Taylor, the International Trade Commission ruled that Converse's alleged trade dress for the midsole design of a combined toe cap, toe bumper, and stripe was not entitled to trademark protection under the common law and found invalid Converse's federal trademark registration. The case was appealed to the U.S. Court of Appeals for the Federal Circuit, which ruled that the ITC had used the wrong test and remanded the case. On remand, the ITC ruled that Converse’s trade dress was protectable but not infringed.

Products

The Weapon 

In 1986, Converse released "The Weapon" basketball shoe. Manufactured in two color schemes to match the kit colors of basketball teams, it has been available in both high-top and low-cut varieties. It had leather construction throughout, including the inside heel which was also heavily padded for comfort. The first endorsers of "The Weapon" were Larry Bird and Magic Johnson, who were prominently featured in a Converse commercial set in Bird's hometown of French Lick, Indiana in 1985. They were also worn by Axl Rose in the Guns N' Roses music video "Estranged".

Converse re-released "The Weapon" classic (which Kobe Bryant wore at least three times in 2002 and Andre Miller wore in 2002 from mid-August to early September) several times from 1999 to 2003 and after, "The Loaded Weapon" in 2003, "The Weapon 86" in 2008 (and the Poorman version in 2009, and the John Varvatos version in 2012), "The Weapon EVO" in 2009, and its successor "The Star Player EVO" (sometimes reduced to "The Star Plyr EVO" or "The Star Ply EVO") in 2010.

Chuck Taylor All Star II 

A redesigned model of the Chuck Taylor All-Star, the Chuck Taylor II, was released in July 28, 2015. Incorporating Nike technology, it retains most of the original's outward appearance while employing newer materials for the insole.

Special editions 

Several special editions of Converse shoes have been made, including DC Comics, Super Mario, Pink Floyd, AC/DC, Metallica, The Ramones, The Clash, Dr. Seuss, Sailor Jerry, Grateful Dead, Ozzy Osbourne, Jimi Hendrix, Miley Cyrus, Drew Brophy, Nirvana, Bad Meets Evil, Green Day, Gorillaz, Matt and Kim, Black Sabbath, and the Who.

Additionally, Converse have made an appearance in over 650 films, such as Back to the Future, I, Robot, Grease and Stand by Me. David Tennant (playing the Tenth Doctor) wore red and cream versions of Hi-top Converse on science-fiction show Doctor Who.

In July 2018, Converse teamed up with BT21, a millennial pop character created by South Korean hip-hop group BTS, to launch the special collaboration line of Chuck Taylor All-Stars featuring the illustrations of BT21 characters; it's currently available in limited quantities in Asia starting from July 27.

Sponsorships
In 2019, Converse returned to the performance basketball scene with the All-Star Pro BB. Kelly Oubre Jr. was the first player to try out the new product, which combined the traditional Converse silhouette with the contemporary Nike technology. Thereafter Converse signed more players: Draymond Green in March 2020, Natasha Cloud (the first WNBA player) in June 2020, Shai Gilgeous-Alexander in July 2020, and, more recently, Rudy Gay, P. J. Tucker, DeAndre' Bembry, De'Anthony Melton, Nickeil Alexander-Walker, Immanuel Quickley, Deividas Sirvydis, Jordan Clarkson, Josh Richardson, David Duke Jr., Brandon Williams. Some of the aforementioned players also wear other brands.

Former football (soccer) teams
  Atlético Nacional (2001–2002)
  Politehnica Timișoara (2006–2008)

Former Converse college teams
 Marquette Golden Eagles – switched to Jordan when most famous alum, Dwyane Wade, signed with Jordan
 Western Kentucky Hilltoppers – shoes only

Due to Converse withdrawing from performance basketball shoes, no college teams are wearing Converse shoes, and only recently, Asi Taulava, Kelly Oubre Jr., and others, as noted above, have once again endorsed the brand after it returned to the basketball court.

Skateboarding 
Under the "CONS" name, Converse launched its skateboarding program in 2009 with a team of "ambassadors": Kenny Anderson, Anthony Pappalardo, Nick Trapasso, Sammy Baca, Ethan Fowler, Raymond Molinar, and Rune Glifberg. In 2012, the company added Jason Jessee and Mike Anderson to its ambassadors team.

In August 2012, Converse sponsored a skate event at Huntington Beach, California, U.S. Trapasso, Tom Remillard, Aaron Homoki, Greyson Fletcher, Ben Raemers, Ben Hatchell, Robbie Russo, and Ben Raybourn participated in the competition that was held. Raybourn eventually won the US$20,000 grand prize, and Homoki won the US$3,000 Best Trick contest.

As of July 2014, the CONS skateboard team consisted of original members Anderson, Trapasso, Baca, and Glifberg, while Jessee, Anderson, Julian Davidson, Remillard, Zered Basset, Ben Raemers, Jake Johnson, Eli Reed, Louie Lopez, Sage Elsesser, and Sean Pablo were subsequently added. Bassett filmed a new advertisement that was broadcast online in July 2014, in which he skateboarded through New York City in a newly launched skate shoe version of the Converse Weapon model, the "CONS Weapon Skate."

Philanthropy
A special collection called "1Hund (RED)", whereby fifteen percent of the profits are used to support HIV/AIDS prevention, was released by the brand. One hundred artists from around the world were chosen to create designs for the collection as part of the (RED) campaign. Professional skateboarder Anthony Pappalardo released a (RED) edition of his high-selling signature skate shoe model in February 2010. Pappalardo explains:

I got into woodworking about two years ago, through a buddy of mine who I used to skate with every day—he turned into a woodworker. So he gave me this scrap box of wood ... It just definitely started consuming me as skating did. I wanted to read about it, you know? Go on the internet and watch videos about it, and just learn anything and everything I could about woodworking. The first thing I ever made was a bench, and that's, kinda, what I've been making ever since. the cool thing about working with Product (RED) is just by doing the two things that I love, I'm also able to help people.

In 2012, Converse was listed as a partner in the (RED) campaign, together with other brands such as Nike, Inc., Girl, and Bugaboo. The campaign's mission is to prevent the transmission of the HIV virus from mother to child by 2015 (the campaign's byline is "Fighting For An AIDS Free Generation").

In the winter of 2018, Converse teamed up with several influential figures in the Los Angeles area to create a collection paying to those who help move the culture forward in the city. Among those selected by the Boston-based footwear brand for this L.A.-themed collection are Vince Staples, Dr. Woo, Rocket, BornXRaised, and Clot.

References

External links 

 

1908 establishments in Massachusetts
1970s fashion
1980s fashion
1990s fashion
2000s fashion
2010s fashion
2020s fashion
Athletic shoe brands
Clothing brands of the United States
Manufacturing companies based in Boston
Clothing companies established in 1908
Nike brands
Shoe companies of the United States
Sporting goods manufacturers of the United States
Sportswear brands
Skateboard shoe companies
Companies that filed for Chapter 11 bankruptcy in 2001
2003 mergers and acquisitions